Tropiometricola is a genus of very small ectoparasitic sea snails, marine gastropod mollusks or micromollusks in   the Eulimidae family.

Species
Species within the genus Tropiometricolainclude :
 Tropiometricola sphaeroconcha (Habe, 1974)

References

 Warén A. (1981) Revision of the genera Apicalia A. Adams and Stilapex Iredale and description of two new genera (Mollusca, Prosobranchia, Eulimidae). Zoologica Scripta 10: 133-154

Eulimidae